In geometry, a hypercone (or spherical cone) is the figure in the 4-dimensional Euclidean space represented by the equation

It is a quadric surface, and is one of the possible 3-manifolds which are 4-dimensional equivalents of the conical surface in 3 dimensions. It is also named "spherical cone" because its intersections with hyperplanes perpendicular to the w-axis are spheres. A four-dimensional right hypercone can be thought of as a sphere which expands with time, starting its expansion from a single point source, such that the center of the expanding sphere remains fixed.  An oblique hypercone would be a sphere which expands with time, again starting its expansion from a point source, but such that the center of the expanding sphere moves with a uniform velocity.

Parametric form
A right spherical hypercone can be described by the function

with vertex at the origin and expansion speed s.

A right spherical hypercone with radius r and height h can be described by the function

An oblique spherical hypercone could then be described by the function

where  is the 3-velocity of the center of the expanding sphere.
An example of such a cone would be an expanding sound wave as seen from the point of view of a moving reference frame: e.g. the sound wave of a jet aircraft as seen from the jet's own reference frame.

Note that the 3D-surfaces above enclose 4D-hypervolumes, which are the 4-cones proper.

Geometrical interpretation
The spherical cone consists of two unbounded nappes, which meet at the origin and are the analogues of the nappes of the 3-dimensional conical surface. The upper nappe corresponds with the half with positive w-coordinates, and the lower nappe corresponds with the half with negative w-coordinates.

If it is restricted between the hyperplanes w = 0 and w = r for some nonzero r, then it may be closed by a 3-ball of radius r, centered at (0,0,0,r), so that it bounds a finite 4-dimensional volume. This volume is given by the formula r4, and is the 4-dimensional equivalent of the solid cone. The ball may be thought of as the 'lid' at the base of the 4-dimensional cone's nappe, and the origin becomes its 'apex'.

This shape may be projected into 3-dimensional space in various ways. If projected onto the xyz hyperplane, its image is a ball. If projected onto the xyw, xzw, or yzw hyperplanes, its image is a solid cone. If projected onto an oblique hyperplane, its image is either an ellipsoid or a solid cone with an ellipsoidal base (resembling an ice cream cone). These images are the analogues of the possible images of the solid cone projected to 2 dimensions.

Construction
The (half) hypercone may be constructed in a manner analogous to the construction of a 3D cone. A 3D cone may be thought of as the result of stacking progressively smaller discs on top of each other until they taper to a point. Alternatively, a 3D cone may be regarded as the volume swept out by an upright isosceles triangle as it rotates about its base.

A 4D hypercone may be constructed analogously: by stacking progressively smaller balls on top of each other in the 4th direction until they taper to a point, or taking the hypervolume swept out by a tetrahedron standing upright in the 4th direction as it rotates freely about its base in the 3D hyperplane on which it rests.

Measurements

Hypervolume 
The hypervolume of a four-dimensional pyramid and cone is 

where V is the volume of the base and h is the height (the distance between the centre of the base and the apex).

Surface volume 
The surface volume of the spherical base is the same as for any sphere, . Therefore, the total surface volume of a right spherical cone can be expressed in the following ways:

 Radius and height
(the volume of the base plus the volume of the lateral 3D surface; the term  is the slant height)

 Radius and slant height
 Surface area, radius, and slant height

Temporal interpretation

If the w-coordinate of the equation of the spherical cone is interpreted as the distance ct, where t is coordinate time and c is the speed of light (a constant), then it is the shape of the light cone in special relativity. In this case, the equation is usually written as:

which is also the equation for spherical wave fronts of light. The upper nappe is then the future light cone and the lower nappe is the past light cone.

See also
3-sphere
Hypercube
Hyperplane
Hypersurface
Manifold
Light cone

References

Four-dimensional geometry
Quadrics
Multi-dimensional geometry